The Dutch Tweede Divisie in the 1959–60 season was contested by 25 teams, twelve of which playing in group A, thirteen in group B.

Eight teams would play against relegation this season in a play-off. Two teams already had to play in it on the basis of last season's results: ONA and Velocitas 1897. The other six participants were the lowest ranked teams of this season. The changes were part of an attempt by the KNVB to make the Tweede Divisie one league next year. Also, one extra team would be promoted to the Eerste Divisie this year, through a play-off between the third-place finishers of both groups.

New entrants and group changes

Tweede Divisie A
Relegated from the Eerste Divisie
HFC Haarlem
Roda Sport
Entered from the B-group:
NEC

Tweede Divisie B
Entered from the A-group:
FC Hilversum
Velox
SV Zeist

Final tables

Tweede Divisie A

Tweede Divisie B

Promotion play-offs / Tweede Divisie A

EBOH were promoted to Eerste Divisie.

Promotion play-offs / Tweede Divisie B

Enschedese Boys were promoted to Eerste Divisie.

The two losing sides played off for the final promotion spot:

sc Heerenveen were promoted to Eerste Divisie.

Relegation play-offs

Play-off

See also
 1959–60 Eredivisie
 1959–60 Eerste Divisie

References
Netherlands - List of final tables (RSSSF)

Tweede Divisie seasons
3
Neth